Kings Lake is a natural lake in South Dakota, in the United States.

Kings Lake has the name of John King, a pioneer who settled there.

See also
List of lakes in South Dakota

References

Lakes of South Dakota
Lakes of Codington County, South Dakota